Park In-hyeok (born 29 December 1995) is a South Korean footballer who plays as a forward for K League 2 club Jeonnam Dragons.

Club career

Kyung Hee University
Born in the capital Seoul, in 2013, Park started playing for his university's football team, Kyung Hee University, where he was a striker. He left university in 2015 and signed for TSG 1899 Hoffenheim.

TSG 1899 Hoffenheim
In 2015, he joined German Bundesliga side TSG 1899 Hoffenheim.

FSV Frankfurt
In the summer of 2015, Park joined German 2. Bundesliga club FSV Frankfurt on a one-year loan from TSG 1899 Hoffenheim. His debut came in a 2–0 away win against Berliner FC Dynamo in the DFB-Pokal, coming on for Edmond Kapllani in the 88th minute. He then made his league debut in 1–2 home loss to Karlsruher SC coming on in the 72nd minute for Zlatko Dedić.

Koper
In 2016, Park joined Slovenian team Koper on a season-long loan from TSG 1899 Hoffenheim. He made his debut on 10 September 2016 coming on as a substitute for Joel Valencia in the 80th minute against Krško in a 1–0 win.

Vojvodina
On the last day of 2017 summer transfer window, Park signed a one-year-loan-deal with Vojvodina.

International career

While playing with Vojvodina, Park played for South Korean national U23 team at the 2018 AFC U-23 Championship.

References

External links
Park In-hyeok at Kicker

1995 births
Living people
Footballers from Seoul
Association football forwards
South Korean footballers
South Korea under-20 international footballers
South Korea under-23 international footballers
South Korean expatriate footballers
South Korean expatriate sportspeople in Germany
South Korean expatriate sportspeople in Serbia
Expatriate footballers in Germany
Expatriate footballers in Slovenia
Expatriate footballers in Serbia
TSG 1899 Hoffenheim players
FSV Frankfurt players
FC Koper players
FK Vojvodina players
Daejeon Hana Citizen FC players
Jeonnam Dragons players
2. Bundesliga players
Slovenian PrvaLiga players
Serbian SuperLiga players
K League 2 players
Kyung Hee University alumni